Apatrobus is a genus of ground beetles in the family Carabidae. There are more than 20 described species in Apatrobus, found mainly in Japan.

Species
These 21 species belong to the genus Apatrobus:

 Apatrobus cornifer Kasahara & Y.Ito, 1994
 Apatrobus echigonus (Habu & Baba, 1962)
 Apatrobus hasemiya Morita, 1990
 Apatrobus hayachinensis (Nakane, 1968)
 Apatrobus hekosanus Sasakawa, 2020
 Apatrobus hikosanus (Habu, 1953)
 Apatrobus ishiharai Kasahara & Y.Ito, 1994
 Apatrobus ishizuchiensis (Habu, 1976)
 Apatrobus iturupensis Lafer, 2001  (Russia)
 Apatrobus iwasakii Morita, 1987
 Apatrobus jakuchiensis (Habu, 1977)
 Apatrobus kurosawai Morita, 1986
 Apatrobus narukawai Morita, 1989
 Apatrobus nishiawakurae (Habu, 1980)
 Apatrobus odanakai Kasahara, 1995
 Apatrobus ohdaisanus (Nakane, 1963)
 Apatrobus ohtsukai Morita, 1993
 Apatrobus osuzuyamanus Sasakawa & Toki, 2007
 Apatrobus satoui (Habu, 1976)
 Apatrobus tsurugiensis (Habu, 1976)
 Apatrobus yamajii Kasahara, 1995

References

Trechinae